"Coming Home" is a song by American glam metal band Cinderella from their 1988 album Long Cold Winter. The song was a US #20 hit for Cinderella in 1988. "Coming Home" is a heavy blues-based power ballad, with 12-string guitar, that shows the band going in a more blues rock direction. It was the third single released from the album. The song was used on the TV series October Road.

Charts

References

1988 songs
1989 singles
Cinderella (band) songs
Mercury Records singles
Songs written by Tom Keifer
Glam metal ballads